The Stellas are a married Canadian country music duo from Whitby, Ontario. They finished in fourth place on the second season of the CMT series Can You Duet in 2009. Their self-titled debut album was released by EMI Music Canada in September 2011. The first single was a cover of the Fairground Attraction's song "Perfect". In July 2014, the duo released "Gravy", which doubles as the first single off their second album. An Irish rock and roll showband  by the same name was active in the sixties releasing a single covering Wooly Bully and "Fortune Teller".

Personal life

Brad and MaryLynne met when they were age 20.  The married couple has been together for sixteen years playing in bands and writing country pop music.

Brad played bass in rock bands for years, but was drawn to writing country. MaryLynne had never written songs until she met Brad. She grew up one of eight kids, which her late father supported as a musician (he was once a member of The Platters).

MaryLynne and Brad both performed in cover bands and hosted a weekly open mic where they eventually became a musical duo.  The couple also opened a 15,000-square-foot music school, The Music Scene, which included a stage and auditorium.

Brad and MaryLynne have two daughters, Lennon and Maisy , who are known for their roles on the ABC show Nashville.

Career

In 2009, The Stellas tried out for the U.S. show Can You Duet, performing songs by Paul McCartney and Cyndi Lauper.  Following their audition for the Country Music Television show, The Stellas performed weekly for millions of American viewers and earned fourth place in the competition.  This led fellow Canadian and multi-platinum artist, Johnny Reid, to offer The Stellas the opening slot on his sold-out Canadian tour.  Eventually, Brad and MaryLynne inked a deal with EMI Music Canada.  In 2012, they released their self-titled album, which was produced by Britain's Nick Trevisick (Paramore, Katy Perry, Sting).  The Stellas wrote most of the songs on their 10-track self-titled debut album, except for a cover of Fairground Attraction's “Perfect” and a live version of Boudleaux Bryant's “Love Hurts”.

Collaborations on the album include Trevisick on “Take It Slow”, Pistol Annies’ Angaleena Presley on “I Can’t Listen to Love Songs” and multi-platinum Nashville songwriter John Scott Sherrill (Kris Kristofferson, Willie Nelson) on “Wished for You”.

The Stellas were featured on volume 6 and volume 7 of the Now Country Canada albums. They are one of the two Canadian acts featured on those albums. They are also featured on The Best of Now Country Canada album that came out in May 2014.

The Stellas have supported multiple sold-out tours with Zac Brown Band. Zac Brown recorded and released a song called "Let It Rain" that he wrote with Brad for his EP The Grohl Sessions, Vol. 1 (released in 2013). It is the only song on that album that Dave Grohl plays drums on.

In July 2014, The Stellas released "Gravy", a blend of twang and tongue-in-cheek humor that doubles as the first single from the duo's second album. Fred Wilhelm, who helped The Stellas write "Gravy", co-wrote several other songs, including a track called "It Wouldn't Be This".

Awards

The Stellas have been nominated for eleven awards.  They won the 2013 CCMA Group or Duo of the Year award, the 2013 CMAO Group or Duo of the Year award and the 2012 CCMA Video of the Year award.  Brad has also been nominated for the Glenn Cole Award, RCTA, JUNOES, and RIAA awards.

Discography

Studio albums

Singles

Music videos

Songwriting credits

Brad Stella
 Matt York – “Lucky Man” (2009)
 Jake Mathews – “Our Own Back Yard”
 The Orchard – “Stick to Your Guns” (2012)
 Zac Brown Band – “Let It Rain” (2013)
 Lennon & Maisy - “Christmas Coming Home” (2012)
 The Stellas – “Christmas Comin’ Home"
 The Stellas – “I Can’t Listen to Love Songs”
 The Stellas – “In This House”
 The Stellas – “Riding in the Back Seat”
 The Stellas – “Take It Slow”
 The Stellas – “I Wished for You”

MaryLynne Stella

 The Orchard – “Stick to Your Guns” (2012)
 Lennon & Maisy - “Christmas Coming Home” (2012)
 Pete Lesperance – “Satellites” (2012)
 The Stellas – “Christmas Comin’ Home"
 The Stellas – “I Can’t Listen to Love Songs”
 The Stellas – “In This House”
 The Stellas – “The Game”
 The Stellas – “Woe Is Me”
 The Stellas – Life of Riley"
 The Stellas – “Take It Slow”
 The Stellas – “I Wished for You”

Awards and nominations

References

External links

The Stellas at CMT

Canadian country music groups
Country music duos
Musical groups established in 2009
Musical groups from the Regional Municipality of Durham
Whitby, Ontario
Canadian musical duos
Male–female musical duos
Married couples
2009 establishments in Ontario
Canadian Country Music Association Group or Duo of the Year winners